Ockert Petrus van Zyl (born 6 May 1991) is a South African rugby union player, who last played with the . His regular position is lock or flanker.

Rugby career

He moved to the Wellington-based  for the 2016 season.

Personal life

Van Zyl's uncle – also called Ockie – was also a first class rugby player between 2004 and 2013.

References

South African rugby union players
Living people
1991 births
Rugby union players from Bloemfontein
Rugby union locks
Rugby union flankers
Boland Cavaliers players
Griffons (rugby union) players